Derrick Helton (born 1985) is an American Paralympic wheelchair rugby player from Tuscumbia, Missouri. In 2011 and 2012 he was a U.S. National Champion and won a gold medal and in 2010 he was awarded bronze at the same place. He also was a 2009 and 2011 American Zonals gold medalist and also won gold at the 2008 Summer Paralympics and bronze at the 2012 ones. In 2010 he was also awarded with the gold medal for his participation at the World championship.

References

1985 births
Living people
Paralympic gold medalists for the United States
Paralympic bronze medalists for the United States
American wheelchair rugby players
People from Miller County, Missouri
Medalists at the 2008 Summer Paralympics
Medalists at the 2012 Summer Paralympics
Wheelchair rugby players at the 2008 Summer Paralympics
Wheelchair rugby players at the 2012 Summer Paralympics
Paralympic medalists in wheelchair rugby
Paralympic wheelchair rugby players of the United States
Pima Community College alumni